The Following is an American crime thriller television series created by Kevin Williamson, and jointly produced by Outerbanks Entertainment and Warner Bros. Television.

The first season follows former FBI agent Ryan Hardy (Kevin Bacon) trying to help recapture serial killer Joe Carroll, while Carroll's assembled cult captures Carroll's son from his ex-wife and sends Carroll's messages to the world. The second season introduces Hardy's niece, who provides help in finding Carroll after his faked death while also dealing with a new cult.

The series was broadcast on the commercial broadcast television network Fox. In its first two seasons, it starred Kevin Bacon and James Purefoy in leading roles, as well as Shawn Ashmore, Natalie Zea, and Valorie Curry. The first season, comprising 15 episodes, premiered on January 21, 2013, and concluded on April 29, 2013. On March 4, 2013, the series was renewed for a second season, which premiered on January 19, 2014, and concluded on April 28, 2014. The series' renewal for a third season was announced on March 7, 2014, and the season premiered on March 2, 2015. On May 8, 2015, Fox canceled The Following after three seasons. The final episode aired on May 18, 2015.

Overview
The Followings first season centers on former FBI agent Ryan Hardy (Kevin Bacon) and his attempts to recapture serial killer Joe Carroll (James Purefoy), following the latter's escape from prison. Hardy soon discovers that Carroll has surrounded himself with a group of like-minded individuals, whom he met while teaching and in prison, turning them into a cult of fanatical killers, making Emma Hill (Valorie Curry) his right-hand woman. When Carroll's son, Joey Matthews (Kyle Catlett), is abducted by his father's followers, Agents Mike Weston (Shawn Ashmore), Debra Parker (Annie Parisse), and the rest of the FBI team discover that it is the first step in Carroll's wider plan to escape custody, humiliate Hardy, and be reunited with his ex-wife Claire Matthews (Natalie Zea).

The second season centers on a new cult, led by Lily Gray (Connie Nielsen) and her twin sons Mark and Luke Gray (both played by Sam Underwood), as they begin to make public statements to lure Carroll out of hiding while the rest of the world believes him to be dead. Weston is re-recruited by Special Agent Mendez (Valerie Cruz) and the FBI in order to find the new cult, while Hardy and his niece Max Hardy (Jessica Stroup) have their own plans to track them down and find Carroll, if he is in fact alive.

The third season follows Hardy's life after Carroll's arrest and shows Hardy in a better place. He is close to his niece and has a girlfriend. Weston follows a different path and chooses to hunt down Mark Gray. Carroll is on death row, waiting to be executed, but plays an important role in the season. Another serial killer proves to be just as dangerous and capable as Joe Carroll.

Cast and characters

Main cast
 Kevin Bacon as Ryan Hardy, a former FBI agent, recalled to assist the FBI once Joe Carroll escapes and his cult begins to develop.
 Jeananne Goossen as Jennifer Mason (pilot), an FBI agent who is replaced by Debra Parker after the pilot episode.
 Natalie Zea as Claire Matthews (seasons 1–2), Joe Carroll's ex-wife, who also had a relationship with Ryan Hardy
 Annie Parisse as Debra Parker (season 1), head of the investigation on Joe Carroll and his cult
 Shawn Ashmore as Mike Weston, a young FBI agent who later becomes romantically involved with Ryan's niece, Max
 Valorie Curry as Emma Hill (seasons 1–2), a follower and romantic partner of Joe Carroll
 Nico Tortorella as Jacob Wells (season 1), one of Joe Carroll's followers and romantic interest of both Emma and Paul
 Adan Canto as Paul Torres (season 1), one of Joe Carroll's followers, working closely with Jacob and Emma
 Kyle Catlett as Joey Matthews (season 1), Joe Carroll and Claire Matthews' son
 Maggie Grace as Sarah Fuller (pilot), Joe Carroll's last victim before his capture.
 James Purefoy as Joe Carroll, a former professor turned serial killer and cult leader, based on Stu Macher from Scream (1996)
 Sam Underwood as Luke and Mark Gray (seasons 2–3), Lily's psychopathic twin sons
 Jessica Stroup as Max Hardy (seasons 2–3), niece of Ryan Hardy and a New York City Police Department detective
 Tiffany Boone as Mandy Lang (season 2), daughter of Judy, an admirer and daughter-figure to Joe Carroll who gets caught between him and Lily
 Connie Nielsen as Lily Gray (season 2), cult leader, admirer of Carroll, and mother of Luke and Mark
 Zuleikha Robinson as Gwen (season 3), an emergency room physician and Ryan Hardy's girlfriend
 Gregg Henry as Arthur Strauss (recurring season 2; starring season 3), a doctor and Joe Carroll's mentor who introduced him to killing
 Michael Ealy as Theo Noble (season 3), a follower of Dr. Strauss and a hacking genius, Strauss considers him his best student

Recurring cast
 John Lafayette as Scott Turner (seasons 1–3), head of the Marshals' detail participating in the investigation of Joe Carroll's cult, later provides protection for Claire Matthews
 Afton Williamson as Haley Mercury (season 1, guest star season 3), owner of an online fetish site who assists Ryan Hardy in tracking Joe Carroll's and Mark Gray's followers
 Valerie Cruz as Gina Mendez (seasons 2–3), an FBI agent who is head of the investigation on Joe Carroll and the new cults formed a year after his supposed death
 Mike Colter as Nick Donovan (seasons 1 & 3), an FBI agent who assumes command of the FBI team following Joe Carroll's second escape from prison
 Felix Solis as Jeff Clarke (seasons 2–3), an FBI special agent and Ryan Hardy's direct liaison to the director of the FBI

Season 1

 Billy Brown as Troy Riley, an FBI agent who initially assisted Ryan Hardy in the days following Joe Carroll's escape from prison
 Chinasa Ogbuagu as Deirdre Mitchell, an FBI agent, specializing in following and tracking cult information on the computer
 Michael Drayer and Virginia Kull as Rick and Maggie Kester, followers of Joe Carroll
 Li Jun Li as Megan Leeds, hostage of Paul, Jacob, and Emma
 Warren Kole as Tim "Roderick" Nelson, Joe Carroll's friend and second in command of the cult
 Annika Boras as Louise Sinclair, follower of Joe Carroll and love interest of Roderick
 Jennifer Ferrin as Molly, one of Joe Carroll's followers, planted to develop a romantic relationship with Ryan Hardy
 Renée Elise Goldsberry as Olivia Warren, Joe Carroll's attorney
 Tom Lipinski as Charlie Mead, an ex-militant and member of Joe Carroll's cult assigned to stalk Claire Matthews in the years following Joe Carroll's incarceration
 Christopher Denham, Steve Monroe, and Arian Moayed as Vince McKinley, Jordy Raines, and David, followers of Joe Carroll

Season 2

 Carrie Preston as Judy Lang, admirer of Joe Carroll with whom he lives for a year after going into hiding
 Camille De Pazzis as Giselle, adoptive daughter of Lily Gray.
 Bambadjan Bamba, Hugues Faustin and Rita Markova as Sami, Jamel and Radmilla, Lily Gray's illegitimate children
 Jake Weber and Jacinda Barrett as Micah and Julia, the leaders of the Korban cult
 Shane McRae, Mackenzie Marsh, Josh Salatin, and Liza de Weerd as Robert, Tilda, Lucas, and Angela, members of the Korban cult
 Leslie Bibb as Jana Murphy, a retired FBI agent, Gina's ex-girlfriend and a friend and helper of Joe Carroll
 Tom Cavanagh as Kingston Tanner, televangelist who denounces Joe Carroll
 Carter Jenkins as Preston Tanner, Kingston's son
 Sprague Grayden as Carrie Cooke, a tabloid reporter with an on-and-off relationship with Ryan Hardy

Season 3

 Michael Irby as Andrew Sharp, ex-student of Arthur Strauss
 Gbenga Akinnagbe as Tom Reyes, Max's boyfriend who is also member of the FBI Hostage Rescue Team
 Ruth Kearney as Daisy Locke, ex-student of Arthur Strauss
 Monique Gabriela Curnen as Erin Sloan, an FBI tech analyst 
 Hunter Parrish as Kyle Locke, ex-student of Arthur Strauss
 Anna Wood as Juliana Barnes, lawyer of Arthur Strauss
 Annet Mahendru as Eliza

Production

Conception
Bob and Harvey Weinstein approached Kevin Williamson in early 1999 to pursue a full script for a third installment of the Scream franchise, Scream 3. However, following his successes with the Scream series and other projects such as I Know What You Did Last Summer, Williamson had become involved in multiple projects. These included the development of the short-lived TV series Wasteland and directing his self-penned film Teaching Mrs. Tingle (1999), which Williamson had written prior to Scream and which had languished in development hell since. Unable to develop a full script for the production, Williamson instead wrote a 20- to 30-page draft outline for the film that involved the return of Ghostface to the fictional town of Woodsboro where the Stab series, a fictional series of films within a film that exist within the Scream universe and are based on the events of Scream, would be filmed. The Weinsteins hired Arlington Road scribe Ehren Kruger to replace Williamson and helm writing duties, developing a script based on Williamson's notes.

The environment for Scream 3s development had become more complicated than with previous films. There was an increased scrutiny on the effects of violence in media and the effect it could have on the public in the aftermath of the Columbine High School massacre which occurred shortly before production began on the film. In addition, since the release of the original Scream films, various acts of violence had taken place which had gained notoriety and media attention when they were linked to, or blamed on, the films. Eager to avoid further criticism or connection to such incidents, Williamson's notes were largely discarded as the studio insisted that the script should focus on the comedic elements of the series while significantly reducing the violence.

In a 2013 interview, Williamson detailed his original script, which would have seen the killers be a Stab fan club of Woodsboro kids working on the orders of a still-alive Stu Macher from prison. All the members of the club would have been involved in the killings and the final twist "of the movie was when Sidney walked into the house after Ghostface had killed everyone ... and they all rose up. None of them were actually dead and they'd planned the whole thing." Williamson then adapted his original script as a television pitch, The Following, removing all references to the Scream franchise. Williamson pitched The Following to Fox rather than another company because it was "home of his all-time favorite show, 24. Comparing Hardy to Jack Bauer, he described the character as someone who "will die saving the moment" and "[carries] the weight of every victim on his shoulders".

Williamson knew he wanted to produce a show that would be gory and knew it would be controversial. When Fox Broadcasting chief operating officer Joe Earley was asked about the subject material, he answered that the network felt pressured to draw in a large audience to equal the broad scope and intensity of the narrative.

Writing
To slip gory scenes past the Standards and Practices department at Fox Broadcasting, Williamson explained, "There are tricks... Okay, in the same episode there's an actor cutting someone in the jugular, and you're harping on the sex scene? So I sent a little email to [Fox Entertainment chairman] Kevin Reilly, and within 15 minutes the broadcast-and-standards people were like, 'It's okay'".

Casting
Williamson wanted to cast "a tough guy with a boyish side" as Ryan Hardy and told his agent that he had someone like Kevin Bacon in mind for the role. When his agent suggested Bacon himself, Williamson discovered that Bacon had spent the past four years trying to find a television program he would like to do. Bacon described his attraction to the role as stemming from the way it centered on a life-or-death situation. Jeananne Goossen  was cast in the role of FBI agent Jennifer Mason in the pilot, but the role was reworked and in subsequent episodes her character was written out and replaced by Special Agent Debra Parker, played by Annie Parisse.

Filming
The lighthouse scenes in the first season's finale were filmed at the Fire Island Lighthouse in Fire Island, New York.

Episodes

Reception

Ratings
Including other digital sources, the premiere episode was watched by a total of 20.34million viewers.

Critical reception
The Followings first season was given 62/100 on Metacritic based on 32 reviews, indicating "generally favorable" reviews.

USA Todays Robert Bianco rated the show highly, calling it "one of the most violent, and certainly the most frightening, series ever made by a commercial broadcast network," adding "some plot twists seem implausible at best, others are overdone or gratuitous. But some implausibility comes with the horror/suspense genre, and there's no question [Kevin] Williamson has mastered it — just as there's no question that the match of wills between the wounded [Kevin] Bacon and malevolent [James] Purefoy is exceedingly well played."

Ken Tucker of Entertainment Weekly stated: "The weakest part of The Following is the idea that Carroll was a college professor who held his classes spellbound with lectures about Thoreau, Emerson, and, most crucially, Edgar Allan Poe." He added: "The drama's strongest elements override this flaw. Both Bacon and Purefoy are so intensely earnest, The Following quickly supersedes its patent Silence of the Lambs setup. The moments that focus on Carroll's criminal cult give the series its real power, and the modern-day variations on Charlie Manson's kill-crazy crew are genuinely spooky."

The Wall Street Journal's Nancy Dewolf Smith considers the series "both better and worse than those movies where a procession of young people get killed so reliably and gorily that the audience laughs after it screams," adding, "There is some suspense here, even if it is mainly because the violence when it comes is so swift and sickening. But the show still feels slack. Is it a case of a serial-killer cliché too far?"

Hank Stuever of The Washington Post called the series "a trite, gratuitously violent exercise in still more stylishly imagined American horror stories." He added, "It is filled with melodramatic sleuthing that you've seen over and over."

Alessandra Stanley of The New York Times said the series was "hard to turn off and even harder to watch" and that "precisely because it is so bleak and relentlessly scary, The Following offers a more salutary depiction of violence than do series that use humor to mitigate horror — and thereby trivialize it."

Awards and accolades

Broadcasts
The series is broadcast in Canada through the CTV television system. For season three, the show will be broadcast on Canada's sibling specialty service Bravo. Internationally, it also airs on Nine Network in Australia, TF1 in France, Warner Channel in Latin America, SABC 3 in South Africa, Jack City in the Philippines, Canal+ & TVN7 in Poland, FOX in Portugal, and Sky Atlantic in the United Kingdom, and around 2015 will start to air in Colombia on Caracol Television.

Notes

References

External links
 

 
2013 American television series debuts
2010s American crime drama television series
2015 American television series endings
English-language television shows
Fox Broadcasting Company original programming
Saturn Award-winning television series
Serial drama television series
Television series by Warner Bros. Television Studios
Television shows set in Virginia
Television shows set in Maryland
Television shows set in New York (state)
Television shows filmed in New York (state)
Crime thriller television series
Television series created by Kevin Williamson
Television series about cults